Charles James "Chooka" Farrell (28 June 1898 – 14 March 1972) was an Australian rules footballer who played for Essendon in the Victorian Football League (VFL).

Farrell was a half back flanker, recruited from Williamstown Juniors. He represented the VFL interstate team in both 1921 and 1922. Farrell missed out on a spot in the 1923 VFL Grand Final, despite participating in the finals series, but was an Essendon premiership player in 1924. He later captain-coached Yarraville in the Victorian Football Association (VFA).

References

Holmesby, Russell and Main, Jim (2007). The Encyclopedia of AFL Footballers. 7th ed. Melbourne: Bas Publishing.

1898 births
1972 deaths
Essendon Football Club players
Essendon Football Club Premiership players
Yarraville Football Club players
Yarraville Football Club coaches
Australian rules footballers from Melbourne
One-time VFL/AFL Premiership players
People from Footscray, Victoria